Huayllabamba District may refer to:

 Huayllabamba District, Sihuas
 Huayllabamba District, Urubamba

Huayllabamba may also refer to the capitals of the aforementioned districts:
 Huayllabamba, Sihuas
 Huayllabamba, Urubamba